Caffeine/ergotamine (trade name Cafergot) is the proprietary name of a medication consisting of ergotamine tartrate and caffeine.  This combination is used for the treatment of headaches, such as migraine headache.

Use

Correct timing of use is important. Cafergot is an abortive headache treatment, which prevents the development of the headache, rather than a treatment for an established headache. The medication should be administered at the first sign of headache.

There exist some limitations as to the maximum number of tablets that can be taken per day per week. Different sources of drug information may carry different information, and patients are encouraged to ask their pharmacist or prescriber about such details.

Cafergot is currently available as a generic drug (ergotamine tartrate/caffeine)

Mechanism of action

According to a topic review on UpToDate, "ergotamine and dihydroergotamine (DHE 45) bind to 5HT 1b/d receptors, just as triptans do." This along with binding to other serotonergic and dopaminergic receptors is their presumed mechanism of action in treating migraine.

Adverse effects

Because the vasoconstrictive effects of ergotamine and caffeine are not selective for the brain, adverse effects due to systemic vasoconstriction can occur. Cold feet or hands, angina pectoris, myocardial infarction, or dizziness are some examples.

References

Antimigraine drugs
Combination drugs